The Holbrook Argus was a weekly newspaper published in Holbrook, Arizona from 1895 until 1913.  Founded by Albert Franklin Banta, the first issue was published on December 12, 1895, as The Argus, the paper changed its name to the Holbrook Argus on May 12, 1900, which remained its name until its run ended in 1913.

References

Newspapers published in Arizona
Publications established in 1895
Weekly newspapers published in the United States
Publications disestablished in 1913
1895 establishments in Arizona Territory
1913 disestablishments in Arizona